Missing Place is the second album from Favorite Blue.

Track listing
 "Sleepless Love"
 "さよならより永遠の中で"
 "Step by step!!"
 "Movin' oN (ALBUM MIX)"
 "Change by me"
 "Season & Sun"
 "君がいたあの夏"
 "True gate"
 "I STILL BELIEVE"
 "Missing place"

1998 albums
Favorite Blue albums